Aliaune Damala Bouga Time Puru Nacka Lu Lu Lu Badara Akon Thiam (born April 16, 1973), known mononymously as Akon, is a Senegalese-American singer, record producer, and entrepreneur. He rose to prominence in 2004 following the release of "Locked Up" (featuring Styles P), the first single from his debut album Trouble (2004), followed by the second single "Lonely".

His second album, Konvicted (2006), received three Grammy Award nominations for Best Contemporary R&B Album, and for Best Rap/Sung Collaboration for "Smack That" (featuring Eminem) and "I Wanna Love You" (featuring Snoop Dogg). Both singles became Billboard Hot 100 top ten hits, followed up by "Don't Matter" and "Sorry, Blame It on Me". His third studio album Freedom (2008) was led by the single "Right Now (Na Na Na)".

Akon often provides vocals as a featured artist and is currently credited with over 300 guest appearances and more than 35 Billboard Hot 100 songs, resulting in five Grammy Award nominations. He is the first solo artist to hold both the number one and two spots simultaneously on the Billboard Hot 100 charts twice. Akon has had four songs certified as 3× platinum, three songs certified as 2× platinum, more than ten songs certified as 1× platinum and more than ten songs certified as gold by the RIAA. He was listed by Guinness World Records as the number-one selling artist for master ringtones in the world.

Along with his own musical career, Akon later founded two record labels, Konvict Muzik and KonLive Distribution. A multitude of successful acts, including Lady Gaga, T-Pain, R. City, Kardinal Offishall, Jeffree Star, and French Montana have been signed to Akon through these labels. Akon sports a concurrent career in producing and songwriting records mainly for artists on his respective labels, as well as for other mainstream artists including Michael Jackson, Snoop Dogg, Lionel Richie, Leona Lewis, Sean Paul, and Whitney Houston.

Forbes ranked Akon 80th (Power Rank) in the Forbes Celebrity 100 in 2010 and 5th in the 40 Most Powerful Celebrities in Africa list, in 2011. Billboard ranked Akon No. 6 on the list of Top Digital Songs Artists of the decade.

Early life
Aliaune Damala Bouga Time Puru Nacka Lu Lu Lu Badara Akon Thiam was born on April 16, 1973, in St. Louis, Missouri, to a Muslim family. His mother is dancer Kine Gueye Thiam (née Gueye), and his father is percussionist Mor Thiam. Mor Thiam was born to a Toucouleur family of Quranic scholars in Kaolack, Senegal. Akon spent a significant part of his childhood in Senegal, which he described as his "hometown". Akon learned to play five instruments, including drums, guitar and djembe. At age seven, he and his family relocated to Union City, New Jersey, splitting his time between the United States and Senegal until settling in Newark. Growing up in New Jersey, Akon had difficulties getting along with other children. When he and his older brother reached high school, his parents left them on their own in Jersey City and moved the rest of the family to Atlanta, Georgia. Akon attended William L. Dickinson High School in Jersey City.

Music career

2003–2005: Discovery and Trouble
Music mogul Devyne Stephens, the president of Upfront Megatainment, first heard about Akon when rapper Lil Zane brought him along to Stephens' rehearsal hall, a place that at the time saw talents such as Usher and TLC being developed. The relationship between Stephens and Akon began as a friendship and mentorship, with the young artist regularly stopping by to ask for advice, with Stephens eventually signing him to his production company and began grooming him professionally. The songs Akon recorded with Stephens were brought to the attention of Universal's imprint SRC Records. In an interview with HitQuarters SRC A&R Jerome "Knobody" Foster said, "What caught my attention right away was "Lonely", and I said, 'this kid is official – this is a huge record." Foster and SRC CEO Steve Rifkind immediately boarded a private plane to Atlanta to meet the young artist. Akon knew of Foster's work as producer Knobody and so there was a mutual respect for one another and the pair hit it off.

Akon's solo debut album, Trouble, was released on June 29, 2004. It spawned the singles "Locked Up", "Lonely", "Belly Dancer (Bananza)", "Pot of Gold" and "Ghetto". "Locked Up" reached the number 8 position in the US and number 5 in the UK. "Ghetto" became a radio hit when it was remixed by DJ Green Lantern to include verses from rappers 2Pac and The Notorious B.I.G. The album is a hybrid of Akon's silky, West African-styled vocals mixed with East Coast and Southern beats. Most of Akon's songs begin with the sound of the clank of a jail cell's door with him uttering the word "Konvict".

In 2005, he released the single "Lonely" (which samples Bobby Vinton's "Mr. Lonely"). The song reached the top five on the Billboard Hot 100, and topped the charts in Australia, the UK and Germany. His album also climbed to number one in the UK in April 2005. When music channel The Box had a top ten weekly chart, which was calculated by the number of video requests, Akon's "Lonely" became the longest-running single on the top of the chart, spanning over fifteen weeks. Akon was then featured on two other singles, P-Money's "Keep on Callin'" off the album Magic City, and the other with New Zealand rapper Savage with the single "Moonshine", which had become a success in both New Zealand and Australia, reaching number one in the New Zealand charts. A year later in 2005, he made his first critically acclaimed guest appearance on Young Jeezy's debut album, Let's Get It: Thug Motivation 101, with the song "Soul Survivor". In December the same year, his manager Robert Montanez was killed in a shooting after a dispute in New Jersey.

In 2006, Akon and Young Jeezy suggested plans for a collaborative album.

2006–2008: Konvicted

Akon started his new record label KonLive Distribution under Interscope Records. His second album, Konvicted, was released in November 2006 and debuted at number two on the Billboard 200, selling 286,000 copies in its first week. After only six weeks, Konvicted sold more than one million records in the US. The album was certified platinum after seven weeks, and after sixteen weeks it was certified double platinum. It stayed in the top twenty of the Billboard 200 for 28 consecutive weeks and peaked at number two on four occasions. On November 20, 2007, the RIAA certified the album 'triple platinum' with 3 million units sold in the US.

The album included collaborations with Eminem, Snoop Dogg, and Styles P. The first single "Smack That" (featuring Eminem) was released in August 2006 and peaked at number two on the Billboard Hot 100 for five consecutive weeks. On October 5, 2006, Akon broke a record on the Hot 100, as he achieved the largest climb in the chart's 48-year-history with "Smack That" jumping from number 95 to 7. The leap was fueled by its number six debut on Hot Digital Songs with 67,000 downloads. The record has since been broken several times. "Smack That" was nominated for Best Rap/Sung Collaboration at the 49th Annual Grammy Awards, but lost to Justin Timberlake and T.I.'s "My Love".

"I Wanna Love You", featuring Snoop Dogg, was the second single released in September, it would go on to earn Akon his first number-one single on the Billboard Hot 100, and Snoop's second. "I Wanna Love You" topped the US charts for two consecutive weeks. In January 2007, a third single "Don't Matter" which earned him his first solo number one and second consecutive Hot 100 chart-topper was released. "Mama Africa" was released as a European single in July 2007, making it the fourth overall single from the album. To coincide with the release of the deluxe edition of the album "Sorry, Blame It on Me" debuted in August 2007 on the Hot 100 at number seven.

In February 2007, Akon launched his clothing line Konvict Clothing. It features urban streetwear including denim jeans, hoodies, T-shirts and hats. Aliaune is the upscale version, or high-end line, for males and females, which includes blazers, denim jeans and other items.

He produced and featured on Gwen Stefani's "The Sweet Escape" which has reached No. 2 on the Billboard Hot 100. Akon performed at the American leg of Live Earth. He later recorded a remix of "Wanna Be Startin' Somethin'" by Michael Jackson for the 25th-anniversary rerelease of Jackson's Thriller. He also worked with bachata group Aventura and Reggaeton duo Wisin & Yandel on All Up 2 You. The song received two nominations at the Premios Lo Nuestro 2010 for "Urban Song of the Year" and "Video Collaboration of the Year". He signed Jayko, a Hispanic R&B and Reggaeton artist, to his label.

2008–2009: Freedom
Akon released his third album Freedom on December 2, 2008, which spawned four singles: "Right Now (Na Na Na)", "I'm So Paid" (featuring Lil Wayne and Young Jeezy), "Beautiful" (featuring Colby O'Donis and Kardinal Offishall) and "We Don't Care". Freedom was certified platinum in the US. Rap singer Nelly suggested that Akon, Pharrell, and T-Pain had talked about forming a rap supergroup in 2009. Akon and Konvict Muzik produced hip hop/rock group Flipsyde's 2009 release, State of Survival, released via KonLive Distribution and Cherrytree Records. He was also the executive producer of Kardinal Offishall's fourth solo album Not 4 Sale. The first single "Dangerous", which featured Akon peaked at No. 5 on the Billboard Hot 100. He co-wrote Kon Live artist Lady Gaga's hit "Just Dance", and which earned a Grammy nomination for Best Dance Recording at the 51st Annual Grammy Awards.

After the unexpected death of Michael Jackson, who Akon was working with, Akon released a tribute song called "Cry Out of Joy". Akon said he was close friends with Jackson near the end of Jackson's life in an interview with UK R&B writer Pete Lewis of the award-winning 'Blues & Soul' in October 2008. In July 2008, a song called "Hold My Hand", an R&B duet/collaboration between Michael Jackson and Akon, circulated the internet. It was not included in the tracklist for Freedom as Akon previously stated. During an interview with Tavis Smiley, Akon said that Jackson had planned on a high-profile release including a music video until the track had leaked. This is Jackson's last known song before he died on June 25, 2009. Akon finished work on the song for Jackson's posthumous album, Michael, and it was released as a single in November 2010.

Akon co-wrote and recorded "Put It on My Tab" with New Kids on the Block for their 2008 reunion album The Block. He also co-wrote and produced Leona Lewis' single "Forgive Me" and worked with X Factor 2008 winner Alexandra Burke on her debut album. He later worked with Whitney Houston for her 2009 comeback album I Look to You, appearing on the track "Like I Never Left". Akon collaborated with Pitbull on the single "Shut It Down" from the album "Rebelution" and worked with Matisyahu to remix his single "One Day" on his album Light. He also co-produced singer Natalia Kills' debut single, "Mirrors", from her debut album, Perfectionist. IsThereSomethingICanDo.com, launched On March 25, 2009, The social action collaboration project between the artists Peter Buffett and Akon has partnered with DoSomething.org, to coincide with the release of "Blood Into Gold". The song focused on human trafficking and featured both artists.

David Guetta collaborated with Akon in "Sexy Bitch", the first house track by Akon. The song reached number 1 in more than six countries and charted at 5 on the Billboard Hot 100. He produced and recorded "Oh Africa" for the 2010 World Cup with Pepsi.

According to Forbes, Akon grossed $13 million in 2011, $21 million in 2010, $20 million in 2009 and $12 million in 2008.

2010–2018: Unreleased Stadium album and hiatus
A single, "Angel", produced by Guetta, was released in September 2010, which peaked at number 56 on the US Billboard charts, significantly lower than his previous outings. Akon performed the song during the 2010 Victoria's Secret Fashion Show. Akon travelled to Jamaica to work with Damian, Julian and Stephen Marley. Around the same time, Akon collaborated with Dr. Dre and Snoop Dogg on "Kush", charting on number 36 on the Billboard charts. The single was first intended to from Dr. Dre's forthcoming album Detox; however, it was removed from the final album track list, with the album eventually being unreleased. He also contributed "We Are the World: 25 for Haiti", a charity single in aid of the 2010 Haiti earthquake. After an almost three-year hiatus from solo work, Akon released the promotional single "Dirty Work", featuring Wiz Khalifa, which was released in February 2013, peaking at number 31 on the Rhythmic Billboard charts.

Later that year, on November 11, 2013, Akon released a standalone single titled "So Blue".

On January 1, 2015, Akon released five singles from Stadium. He also announced that the album would be a quintuple album, broken up into five genres (Euro, Pop, Urban, Island & World). All singles failed to chart.

In November 2015, Akon announced via his official website that he was planning to release his fourth album Stadium in four versions: Stadium-Island, Stadium-Urban, Stadium-World and Stadium-House. These editions of the album will be available exclusively via the Stadium mobile app which is supported by ads but allows fans to stream the albums. The album was indefinitely postponed, and might get released in the near future.

In late 2015 and early 2016, Akon released the singles "Want Some", "Hypnotized" and "Good Girls Lie", upon striking a new record deal with Atlantic Records. In April 2016, Akon appeared in the Chinese reality TV show I Am a Singer along with the Taiwanese singer Jeff Chang. Later that year, he was featured on the remix of Joey Montana's single "Picky", and featured alongside Chris Brown on Gucci Mane's Michael Jackson tribute single "Moonwalk".

In late 2017, he released a collaborative mixtape with Konvict signees entitled Konvict Kartel Vol. 2. In 2018, he collaborated with reggaeton singer Ozuna on the bilingual single "Coméntale", the first time that Akon sang in Spanish in a Latin song. At the time, he stated he had adopted the nickname "El Negreeto" and would be pursuing collaborations with other Spanish-language artists.

2019–present: Return to music, Akonik Label Group, El Negreeto, Akonda, and Konnect
Akon has announced his new record label Akonik Label Group and will release four studio albums in different genres. In May 2019, Akon released his first Latin single "Get Money", featuring Puerto Rican rapper Anuel AA. It was intended to be the lead single for his fourth album El Negreeto but didn't appear on the final version of the album. The album was expected to be released on August 30, 2019, but was pushed back and released on October 4, 2019. On September 6, 2019, Akon released "Cómo No" featuring Mexican-American singer Becky G, as the lead single from El Negreeto. He released the album Akonda on October 25, 2019, and his sixth album, Konnect, in December of the same year.

Philanthropy

Akon also started a project Akon Lighting Africa in 2014 which provides electricity in 15 countries of Africa.

He also launched his own charity for underprivileged children in Africa called Konfidence Foundation.

Akon was included as a guest appearance in Pitbull's "I Believe That We Will Win (World Anthem)" official music video, in which all proceeds from the song's sales, streaming and views are being donated to Feeding America and the Anthony Robbins Foundation as relief to those affected by the COVID-19 pandemic.

Akon City

In 2018, Akon announced he was working with the Senegalese government to build a tourist city with a cryptocurrency-based economy named Akon City, using Akon's own cryptocurrency, Akoin, at the transactional center.

On January 13, 2020, Akon shared on Twitter that the agreements for the city have been finalized and the project is underway. He captioned a photo of himself with Senegal president Macky Sall "Looking forward to hosting you there in the future."

In June 2020, it was announced that the engineering and consulting firm KE International (the same firm responsible for building Mwale Medical and Technology City) had been awarded a $6 billion contract to build the city. Phase 1 of construction, which is due to begin construction in 2023 and be completed in 2026, is to include roads, a hospital, residences, hotels, a police station, a waste facility, a school, and a solar power plant.

The project has not begun construction, well past schedule; locals are concerned about a lack of progress. On September 1, 2020, Akon told a news conference that he had laid the first stone of the $6 billion city. "The stone itself sits at the bottom of a dirt track in a field; a small placard advertising the megaproject has fallen off it."

A suit has been brought against Akon in the United States by Devyne Stephens for a debt of almost 4 million dollars borrowed as part of the implementation of his futuristic city project. Stephens said that Akon City and Akoin are part of a fraudulent scheme.

Television and film
Akon has confirmed that a reality television show is in the works. It will be called My Brother's Keeper, and the point is that Akon's two nearly identical brothers will go around in Atlanta posing as him fooling people into thinking that it is in fact, Akon. They will try to get VIP treatment and freebies. Akon has said that people have mistaken his brothers for him many times in Atlanta, which is what the show is based on.

In 2006, it was announced that Akon is planning to work on a full-length movie titled Illegal Alien, which will be based on his life. Several sources have reported that actor Mekhi Phifer will portray Akon in the film.

Akon confirmed in an August 2007 interview with the Polish website INTERIA.PL that he worked on a movie called "Cocaine Cowboys", which tells the story of Jon Roberts, the main pilot of the Medellín Cartel.

On November 30, 2007, Akon entered the Big Brother house in Pinoy Big Brother: Celebrity Edition 2 as a guest. He also appeared on the edition of November 17, 2008, of WWE Raw, with Santino Marella citing him in his speech.

He collaborated with music director duo Vishal–Shekhar and the English and Hindi lyrics of "Chammak Challo" as a part of the soundtrack for the 2011 Bollywood film Ra.One.

Akon made his acting debut appearing alongside an ensemble cast in the 2012 Nigerian-American film Black November. In 2014, he starred alongside Hayden Christensen and Adrien Brody in the action movie, American Heist, directed by Sarik Andreasyan.

Personal life
In 2007, Akon claims that he has six children with three women in an interview with Blender, all of whom he has great relationships with. He says he wishes to keep his family protected from the public eye.

Akon owns a diamond mine in South Africa and denies the existence of blood diamonds (also known as "conflict diamonds") saying, "I don't believe in conflict diamonds. That's just a movie. Think about it. Nobody thought or cared about conflict diamonds until Blood Diamond was released." However, he has since stated that he does accept that blood diamonds exist and that he is partial-owner of an African mine that is dedicated to avoiding the use of blood diamonds while also donating profits to local communities.

Akon appeared on the ITV2 show The Hot Desk. He stated on the show that he is a fan of the English Premier League club Chelsea F.C.

Legal issues
Akon has stated that he was part of an auto-theft ring and spent four years in prison from 1999 to 2002. However, in April 2008, The Smoking Gun website challenged his claim with court records and interviews with detectives involved in Akon's case, concluding that he was not convicted of any crime and did not serve time in prison. Akon responded to the report by saying that he never spent 3 years in prison, but had many shorter sentences that add up to three years.

In April 2007, Akon drew criticism for an onstage act which included simulated sex with Danah Alleyne — a 15-year-old girl at the time who is the daughter of a pastor and sister of Crime Watch host Ian Alleyne — at the Zen Nightclub in Port of Spain, Trinidad and Tobago as part of a fake contest, despite the club's statement to have a 21-years-and-over age requirement. The incident was filmed by Akon's crew and later uploaded to the Internet. On April 20, 2007, local media, channel CCN TV6, aired the video clip publicly. Amid criticism on the radio, television, and from the blogosphere, Verizon Wireless removed ringtones featuring Akon's songs. Verizon also decided not to sponsor The Sweet Escape Tour where Akon was to be the opening act for Gwen Stefani. However, Universal Music Group did not take action against Akon, but rather simply ordered the video clip be removed from video-sharing site YouTube due to copyright infringement. Conservative commentator and Parents Television Council founder Brent Bozell called this "corporate irresponsibility".

Right wing political commentators Michelle Malkin, Laura Ingraham, and Bill O'Reilly criticized Akon for "degrading women". Malkin uploaded commentary about Akon to YouTube, using footage from music videos and the Trinidad concert, and Universal Music Group then forced its removal by issuing a DMCA takedown notice. The Electronic Frontier Foundation joined Malkin in contesting the removal as a misuse of copyright law, citing fair use. In May 2007, UMG rescinded its claim to the video, and the video returned to YouTube.

On June 3, 2007, at WSPK's KFEST concert at the Dutchess Stadium in Fishkill, New York, a concert attendee threw an object towards Akon on stage. Akon asked the crowd to identify who threw the object and that he be brought on stage. Security staff grabbed the teen and took him up to the stage. Akon then pulled him up from the crowd and hoisted him across his shoulders. The singer then tossed the attendee back into the crowd from his shoulders. Video of the incident was reviewed by Fishkill police. Akon has said that the incident was staged and that he in fact used the act to set up for the next record. Charges of endangering the welfare of a minor, a misdemeanor, and second-degree harassment, a violation, were filed, according to police Chief Donald F. Williams, and Akon was arraigned on the two charges on December 3, 2007, in the town of Fishkill Court.

In 2010, Buddhist groups in Sri Lanka vehemently protested a planned concert by Akon, saying his music video with Guetta for "Sexy Chick" insulted Buddhism because of the Buddha statue that can be seen several times in the background. Considering the allegations against Akon, the Sri Lankan Government decided not to issue him a visa to enter into Sri Lanka.

Awards and nominations

Discography

 Trouble (2004)
 Konvicted (2006)
 Freedom (2008)
 El Negreeto (2019)
 Akonda (2019)
 TT Freak (2022)

Filmography
 Black November (2012)
 American Heist (2014)
 Popstar: Never Stop Never Stopping'' (2016)

Tours
 Dar Es Salaam, Tanzania One-off Concert (2006).
 Konvicted Tour (July to September 2007, then additional dates in 2008)
 The Sweet Escape Tour with Gwen Stefani (April to July 2007)
 Good Girl Gone Bad Tour with Rihanna (Canadian-leg only, September – December 2008)
 Konvict Muzik Tour with T-Pain (Australia only, October 26–27, 2009)
 Summer Tour, (Brazil-leg only, January to February 2010)
 OMG Tour with Usher (North America Second Leg, April – June 2011)

See also
 
 List of Billboard Hot 100 chart achievements and milestones
 List of artists who reached number one on the UK Singles Chart
 List of artists who have had number-one singles on the UK Official Download Chart
 List of artists who reached number one in the United States

References

External links 

 
 
 

 
1973 births
Living people
21st-century African-American male singers
21st-century American rappers
21st-century American singers
21st-century Senegalese male singers
Activists from Georgia (U.S. state)
Activists from Missouri
Activists from New Jersey
African-American male rappers
African-American male singer-songwriters
African-American Muslims
African-American male actors
African-American record producers
American contemporary R&B singers
Dance-pop musicians
American expatriates in Senegal
American hip hop record producers
American hip hop singers
American humanitarians
American male pop singers
American male rappers
American male singer-songwriters
American mining businesspeople
American people of Senegalese descent
American philanthropists
American tenors
Atlantic Records artists
Businesspeople from Atlanta
Businesspeople from Missouri
Businesspeople from Newark, New Jersey
Dogon
Musicians from Dakar
Musicians from Jersey City, New Jersey
Musicians from Newark, New Jersey
People from St. Louis County, Missouri
People from Union City, New Jersey
Rappers from Atlanta
Rappers from Newark, New Jersey
Rappers from St. Louis
Record producers from Georgia (U.S. state)
Record producers from Missouri
Record producers from New Jersey
Republic Records artists
Senegalese hip hop musicians
Senegalese Muslims
Singer-songwriters from Georgia (U.S. state)
Singer-songwriters from Missouri
Singer-songwriters from New Jersey
Sony Music Publishing artists
Spanish-language singers of the United States
SRC Records artists
Universal Motown Records artists
William L. Dickinson High School alumni
World Music Awards winners